Ryerson is an English surname. It can also be an anglicized spelling of Scandinavian surnames. Originating from Dutch meaning "the son of Ryerse(n), Reyer or Reijer (rider)", the Swedish "Reierson", or Norwegian and Danish's "Reiersen".

Notable people with the surname include:

 Ali Ryerson (born 1952), flutist
 Art Ryerson (1913–2004), American jazz guitarist
 Egerton Ryerson (1803–1882), Educator and politician in early Ontario, Ryerson University named after him
 Emily Ryerson (1863–1939), American survivor of the sinking of RMS Titanic
 Florence Ryerson (1892–1965),  American playwright and screenwriter
 Frank L. Ryerson (1905–1995), American trumpeter, composer, arranger and educator
 Gary Ryerson (born 1948), American baseball player
 George Ryerson (1855–1925), Ontario physician, businessman and politician
 John K. Ryerson (1820–1890), Canadian merchant and politician
 Julian Ryerson (born 1997), Norwegian football player
 Martin A. Ryerson (1856–1932), American businessman, philanthropist.
 Rich Ryerson, American soccer player-coach
 Rob Ryerson (born 1964), U.S. soccer player and coach
 Robert Edwy Ryerson (1865–1958), Canadian politician
 Stanley Bréhaut Ryerson (1911–1998), Canadian historian, educator and political activist
 William Ryerson (1797–1872), Canadian politician and Methodist minister

Fictional
 Ned Ryerson, character in Groundhog Day
 Sandy Ryerson, character in Glee
 Phil Ryerson, Jeff Garlin character in Daddy Day Care
 Max Ryerson, Max Burkholder character in Daddy Day Care (son of Phil)
 Mike Ryerson, Geoffrey Lewis/Christopher Morris character in Salem's Lot (1979)/Salem's Lot (2004)
 Ginny Ryerson, Anna Kendrick character in Rocket Science
 Spike Ryerson, James Drury character in Firehouse

References